IMO or Imo may refer to:

Imo

 Irish Medical Organisation, the main organization for doctors in the Republic of Ireland
 Intelligent Medical Objects, a privately held company specializing in medical vocabularies
 Isomaltooligosaccharide, a mixture of short-chain carbohydrates which has a digestion-resistant property
 Idiopathic Massive Osteolysis, a name for Gorham's disease

Maritime
 International Maritime Organization
 IMO number, a unique identity number issued to seacraft (pattern "1234567")
 SS Imo, a 1889 ship involved in the Halifax Explosion

Meteorology
 International Meteorological Organization
 Icelandic Meteorological Office

Other
 International Mathematical Olympiad
 International Meteor Organization
 Imo State, Nigeria
 imo.im, a video calling and instant messaging app
 IMO (in my opinion), an Internet slang expression
 Integration Management Office see Post-merger integration